The Red Angus is an international breed of beef cattle characterised by a reddish-brown coat colour. It derives from the Scottish Aberdeen Angus population and, apart from the coat colour, is identical to it. Red Angus are registered separately from black Angus cattle in Australia, Canada, and the United States.

History 

The Scottish Angus is usually black, but red individuals occur; this may be the consequence of cross-breeding in the eighteenth century of the small Scottish cattle with larger English Longhorn stock, aimed at increasing their draught power.

In the United States, these red individuals could until 1917 be registered in the herd-book of the American Angus Association. From about 1945, some herds consisting only of red-coated stock were formed. In 1954 a breeders' association, the Red Angus Association of America, was established at a meeting in Fort Worth, Texas. The registered population in 2008 numbered about  head, making it the fifth beef breed by number in the United States; American Angus, Charolais, Hereford and Simmental were more numerous.

In Australia, breeders of the red variant proposed a scheme for registration of their stock with the Angus Society of Australia; it was not accepted, and in 1970 they formed the Red Angus Society of Australia. 

The Red Angus is reported to DAD-IS by Australia, Cuba,     Ecuador, Panama, Peru, Slovenia and the United States; its global conservation status is "not at risk".

Use 

The Red Angus is a beef breed, and is reared only for that purpose. Comparative trials have not identified any commerciallysignificant difference between it and the American Angus. Bulls have been used as sires for crossbreeding. The Red Angus is a parent breed to the Regus (cross-breeding with Hereford) and to the RX3 (a mixture of Hereford, Red Angus and Red Holstein).

References 

Cattle breeds
Cattle breeds originating in Australia
Cattle breeds originating in the United States